Netherseal is a civil parish in the South Derbyshire district of Derbyshire, England.  The parish contains eleven listed buildings that are recorded in the National Heritage List for England.  Of these, three are listed at Grade II*, the middle of the three grades, and the others are at Grade II, the lowest grade.  The parish contains the village of Netherseal and the surrounding countryside.  The listed buildings consist of a church and churchyard walls, a chapel, houses and associated structures, a pigeoncote, a former smithy, a row of almshouses, a farmhouse and a former watermill.


Key

Buildings

References

Citations

Sources

 

Lists of listed buildings in Derbyshire